Ulf Lundberg (born 6 November 1955) is a Swedish former footballer. He made 27 Allsvenskan appearances for Djurgårdens IF and scored one goal.

References

Swedish footballers
IFK Luleå players
IFK Sundsvall players
Djurgårdens IF Fotboll players
1955 births
Living people
Association football defenders
Sweden international footballers